The Yugoslav Left (abbr. ЈУЛ, JUL) was a far-left political party in the Federal Republic of Yugoslavia. At its peak, the party had 20 seats in Republic of Serbia's National Assembly following the 1997 general election.

Ideology
JUL declared itself to be a party of all "left-wing and progressive forces that believed that the general interest always comes above private interest", including communists, socialists, greens, social democrats, and democratic socialists.

History
The party was formed in 1994 by merging 19 left-wing parties, led by the League of Communists – Movement for Yugoslavia (SK-PJ). It was led by Mirjana Marković, originally holding the title of President of the Directorate.

Unlike the Socialist Party of Serbia (SPS) and its ally the Democratic Party of Socialists of Montenegro (DPS) which were direct descendants of the League of Communists of Serbia and Montenegro respectively, the Yugoslav Left was an all-Yugoslavian party with members from both constituent bodies.

Despite these differences, the JUL and the SPS collaborated closely. The JUL generally did not take part in elections separately. Several members of the SPS crossed the floor to JUL at some stage.

On 24 and 25 March 1995, the party held its 1st Congress at the Sava Center in Belgrade, and theatre director Ljubiša Ristić was elected president.

In 1996, the JUL joined the Left Coalition with the SPS and New Democracy. Following the 1997 election, the party had 20 MPs and representatives in various local assemblies. It held five ministerial posts in the second cabinet of Mirko Marjanović.

At the 2nd Congress in Kragujevac on 6 April 2002, Marković was elected President of the Yugoslav Left.

It had a minimal presence in Montenegrin politics. At its peak, the JUL was part of the Patriotic Coalition for Yugoslavia in the 2002 election with the People's Socialist Party of Montenegro, and the Serbian Radical Party. The coalition won less than 3% of the vote and no seats.

In the 2003 election in Serbia, the JUL received only 0.1% of the vote. The party officially ceased to exist on 12 April 2010.

International cooperation
The JUL visited the gatherings of several left-wing political groups in Europe and worldwide. It held ties with the Communist Party of China, the Communist Party of Cuba and the Workers' Party of Korea.

Voter base
Its social base was mainly amongst peasants and pauperized workers, but it also had members from the so-called nouveau riche of Serbia during Milošević's terms in office, and many high-ranked civil servants and army staff. During the 1990s, opponents of Milošević's government sometimes referred to the JUL "a branch of Communist Party of China in Yugoslavia".

Electoral results

Serbian Parliamentary elections

Montenegrin Parliamentary elections

References

Sources

M. Marković interview on the party (2008) 

1994 establishments in Yugoslavia
Communist parties in Montenegro
Communist parties in Serbia
Defunct political parties in Montenegro
Defunct political parties in Serbia
Political parties disestablished in 2010
Political parties established in 1994
Political parties in Yugoslavia
Socialist Party of Serbia
Yugoslavism